Justice Steele may refer to:

Benjamin H. Steele (1837–1873), associate justice of the Vermont Supreme Court
Myron T. Steele (fl. 1970s–2010s), associate justice and chief justice of the Delaware Supreme Court

See also
Steele Justice, 1987 film
Judge Steel (disambiguation)